Periyakurichi is one of the Village panchayat in sendurai of Ariyalur district, Tamil Nadu, India.

Demographics 
As per constitution of India and Panchyati Raaj Act, Periyakurichi village is administrated by Sarpanch (Head of Village) who is elected representative of village

As per the 2011 census, Periyakurichi had a total population of 3533 with 1749 males and 1784 females.

Economy

Agriculture is the only source of income in this village. This village gifted with red sand. So you could see the Different variety of farm. This includes cashew, coconut, sugarcane, paddy, jack fruit, mango and various tropical fruit and vegetables

It has one lime mine site which covers more than 200 acres of land, this is started around early 1990.

Administration and politics 
Periyakkurichy comes under the Kunnam State Assembly Constituency and it elects a member to the Tamil Nadu Legislative Assembly once every five years. The current Member of Legislative Assembly (MLA) of the constituency is S. S. Sivasankar from the DMK Party. Ariyalur is a part of the Chidambaram Lok Sabha constituency and elects a member to the Lok Sabha, the lower house of the Parliament of India, once every five years. The current Member of Parliament from the constituency is M. Chandrakasi from the ADMK party.

School: Periyakkurichy has one Government high school and one Government primary school.

Hospital : Nearest hospital is Ponparappi Government Hospital.

References 

Villages in Ariyalur district